Mount Marriott is a mountain located in British Columbia, Canada. It is a dry peak near the head of the Cayoosh Creek. It is easily reached by trail, and the best time to climb the mountain is in the month of July. There are a few lakes in close proximity to the mountain peak that are swimmable during the months of August and September.

The lake was named in honor of RCAF Flying Officer Terrence James Marriott, who was killed in 1943, while fighting in World War II.

References

Marriott
Pacific Ranges
Lillooet Land District